Sneaky Sasquatch is an adventure game released in 2019 for iOS, Apple TV and macOS as one of the launch titles of Apple Arcade. It is exclusive to this subscription service and is not available on other platforms. It was the 2020 Apple Arcade Game of the Year. The game's scenery is inspired by Squamish, British Columbia, Canada. The game music is provided by A Shell In The Pit and scntfc.

Gameplay 
The protagonist, a Sasquatch, lives near a campground, being friends with local wildlife, stealing food from campers and hiding from park rangers. After obtaining human clothes, Sasquatch mingles among humans and participates in human activities, competes in sports, and even can get a bank account and an office job.

Basics

Sasquatch requires food and sleep.

The game time corresponds to real time as approximately one second for one minute, so the in-game daylight lasts for around 12 minutes. If Sasquatch stays up too late without consuming cafe drinks or energy drinks, he falls asleep and wakes up in his main house, where the raccoon has dragged him to. To avoid this, Sasquatch needs to reach an available bed and sleep in it.

If Sasquatch stays with a completely empty stomach for several minutes, he falls unconscious and is dragged back to the house by the raccoon as well. The raccoon feeds Sasquatch 2 hunger points, so Sasquatch pays 20 coins or all coins if Sasquatch has less than 20 coins. The food can be stolen from the campers, but later players get access to shops, a café, a diner and even a TV shopping channel where they can buy food instead. Fishing is also a source of highly nutritious food.

Authorities
When Sasquatch does not wear any disguise, humans are afraid of him, and alert the authorities whenever they see him. With disguise, regular people take Sasquatch for a human, while authorities like rangers or police still see through it. Later in the game, Sasquatch obtains special outfits which prevent even authorities to recognize him.

Except being recognized as a Sasquatch, other unlawful acts like shoplifting, carjacking, stealing from the port or hitting people with a motor vehicle may trigger authorities to pursue Sasquatch. When Sasquatch is caught by rangers, he is thrown out of the area into any nearby forest clearing. When Sasquatch is caught by the town police, he spends a night in jail and is released the next day at noon in-game. When Sasquatch is caught by the Island Ranger, he is brought to the ferry entrance.

Activities
One of the activities required for progress in Chapter 1 of the storyline is golf, featuring matches from 3 to 9 holes.

There are many racing events. Karting, car racing and drifting take place on the race track. Entering harder races requires passing increasingly harder driving tests, which are a challenge by themselves. Car racing is required for completion of Chapter 1. 

On the water, there is boat racing and canoeing. One particularly long car race is 100 laps long and lasts for around 20 minutes, and there is also a similarly long boat race.

The dirt track features dirt bike racing and freestyle, monster truck racing and car-crushing, and ice racing.

Skiing includes two types of events: fastest descent over several pistes, and freestyle where the goal is to perform the hardest jumps. This activity is required for completion of Chapter 1. 

Snowball fights are played in several formats such as last man standing, team against team, hitting a number of targets in a limited time, or survival against multiple attackers.

Surfing requires the player to do jumps and spins before being overtaken by the wave. The player needs to upgrade their surfboard by beating a lineup of opponents of increasing difficulty.

An arcade in the town hosts several arcade video games made in the style of late 1980s to early 1990s.

Several mini-games are more relaxed collecting activities, such as scuba diving (collecting trash underwater), fishing, mushroom hunting, and collecting dinosaur bones for the museum. However, some rarer varieties of fish and mushroom are hard to find, and may require many in-game days.

Sasquatch can adopt a runaway dog, a Boston Terrier, which requires care and food to grow (constituting a simple virtual pet mini-game), and eventually becomes helpful in finding expensive truffles.

In Chapter 4 of the storyline, Sasquatch can befriend over 50 characters in the game. He can do activities and mini-games to satisfy the friends, and increase the relationship between Sasquatch and the friend. This activity is required for completion of Chapter 4.

Jobs 
Initially the only source of money is selling spare food to an always hungry bear.

As Sasquatch becomes integrated into the human society, he can be hired into several human jobs.

An office job in a big corporation called R Corp involves delivering mail and snacks across several floors of the building, fixing computers, and eventually leads to a promotion to an executive, who dozes through meaningless meetings, signs useless paperwork and plays golf with Mr. Pemberton, the CEO. This job is required for completion of Chapter 2 of the storyline.

The delivery service job and taxi job require the player to drive between certain points of the map in a limited time. The taxi job also requires driving carefully to not scare the passengers.

The police job is mostly about with working as highway patrol, writing tickets to drivers and collecting fines. The possible violations include speeding, driving without license, insurance, or prescribed glasses, driving without headlights at night, or keeping food under the car hood. This job is required for completion of Chapter 3.

The local port offers three jobs: forklift driver, crane operator and security guard. After gaining the port's trust, Sasquatch can pull off a burglary himself for large profits, though that is a challenging activity with high chances of being caught.

Another job is a substitute captain of the local ferry, sailing between the island and the mainland. Later in the game, Sasquatch can sail the ferry to his private campground.

Sasquatch can also invest 1100 coins into a local food delivery service called Spaghetti Hotline. He can get a share of the profits and upgrade the Spaghetti Hotline kitchen for extra coins and money. 

After Sasquatch is elected mayor in the 4th Chapter of the storyline, Sasquatch can fund money to customize the town in the town hall. However, Sasquatch does not get paid as mayor.

Property
The money can be spent to buy multiple vehicles: cars, motorbikes, and boats, and then to upgrade and customize them. Also Sasquatch can expand his house and buy new furniture, purchase additional houses in other parts of the map, or buy some expensive vanity outfits and accessories.

Businesses
The businesses allow the player to invest some of their money to get a passive income later. These businesses include a private campground on an small island, and a spaghetti delivery service in the town.

Seasonal events
There are two seasonal events. Winter holidays event adds additional prizes for the snowball fights mini-game and the snowman building activity.

The Halloween event features trick-or-treating with dressing into multiple outfits, and several Halloween-themed mini-quests.

The prizes for both events are candies, which can be exchanged for corresponding holiday costumes, and decorations for Sasquatch's house. Both events can be started for a day at any time of the year by finding a certain character and paying them.

Storyline 
The main storyline of the game is a multi-chapter mission to save the nature from an evil corporation named R-Corp. As of version 1.9.4, there are 4 chapters in the main storyline.

Chapter 1: The Missing Treasure Map
The peaceful existence of Sasquatch and his animal friends is interrupted by arrival of Mr. Pemberton, a business magnate who wants to destroy the park to build condominiums. The rangers have few days to pay back their debts, and Sasquatch decides to help them by finding a buried treasure. But the duck tore the treasure map into several pieces which were then scattered by the wind, and Sasquatch needs to find them.

Chapter 2: The Suspicious Corporation
After the failure of his plans, Mr. Pemberton decides to resort to unlawful and illegal means. As he keeps his secret illegal plans in his highly secured office safe, Sasquatch must infiltrate the antagonist’s company, rise through the corporate ladder to become an executive and gain Mr. Pemberton's trust, and eventually find the illegal plans and report them to the local police.

Chapter 3: The Polluted Lake
After Mr. Pemberton is arrested for planning illegal actions in Chapter 2, the large crystal blue lake in the campground becomes polluted under mysterious circumstances with its water green. But the police are understaffed and no police detectives are available, so Sasquatch joins the police force, takes orders from a strict and orderly police chief, rises through promotions to become a detective, searches for clues in the sewers and finally solves the mystery himself.

Chapter 4: The Mayoral Election
Sasquatch runs for mayor against Pemberton Jr. by completing 4 different tasks. After Sasquatch wins the mayoral election by 1 vote, he must find Mr. Pemberton, who has escaped from prison during the election. After traveling to the port and finding the two Pembertons, Pemberton Jr. pursues Sasquatch, followed by Mr Pemberton. After defeating Mr. Pemberton, Sasquatch is tricked into walking into a cage trap. Sasquatch is then saved by the campground park ranger and the 6 friends Sasquatch previously made during the mayoral election campaign. Sasquatch then sends Mr. Pemberton and Pemberton Jr. overseas on a cargo ship called S.S. Never Coming Back.

Development 
The game was created by RAC7 Games, a two-person team in Vancouver, Canada. Among their previous titles were Splitter Critters which won iPhone Game of the Year and Apple Design Awards in 2017.

The setting of the game is based on developers’ native British Columbia, specifically Squamish in early 1990s.

The game's prototype, Starvin’ Sasquatch, was developed in 2015 for Ludum Dare 33 competition themed 'You Are the Monster'. It was a simple game about a Sasquatch stealing food from campers. The development continued after that competition, but they did not expect it to sell well on mobile, and put it on hold. After several years of inactivity, the game was expanded to be pitched for Apple Arcade, which allowed the developers not to worry about monetization techniques, together with another title Spek. The goal was to add the silliest activities to imagine a Sasquatch doing, so the ability to drive and race cars and to golf were added, followed by others. The main gameplay and the mini-games were influenced by a range of games such as Metal Gear Solid and Microsoft Golf 2.0. Developers mentioned that they are in the process of adding every type of game they ever wanted to make as a mini-game into Sneaky Sasquatch.

Reception
Sneaky Sasquatch ended 2020 as Apple Arcade's number 1 game in the United States, and number 5 in Canada, and has been recommended as a child friendly game by reviewers.

The game was awarded Apple Arcade Game of the Year in 2020. Part of the game's success has been attributed to players, particularly children, longing for outdoor activities during COVID-19 lockdowns, and surprising amount of content behind what looks like a simple kids’ game. Developers noticed that young child players enjoy even the simplest activities like eating and sleeping, and more hardcore gamers find full completion of the game a decent challenge.

References

External links 
 Sneaky Sasquatch on RAC7 website

2019 video games
Adventure games
Apple Arcade games
Bigfoot in popular culture
iOS games
macOS games
Open-world video games
Single-player video games
Stealth video games
Video games about police officers
Video games developed in Canada
Video games set in Canada
Video games set in forests